General elections were held in Dominica on 19 August 1954. No political parties contested the elections and all candidates ran as independents. Voter turnout was 70.3%.

Results

References

Dominica
Elections in Dominica
General election
Non-partisan elections
British Windward Islands
Dominica
August 1954 events in North America